Robert Edward Kelly (born October 4, 1927) is an American former Major League Baseball pitcher who played for four seasons for the Chicago Cubs from 1951 to 1953, the Cincinnati Redlegs in 1953 and 1958, and the Cleveland Indians in 1958.

Kelly led East Cleveland Shaw High School to a state title in 1944, compiling a 7–2 record in 13 games with 75 strikeouts. He attended Purdue University, where he played college baseball for the Boilermakers from 1946 to 1947. Kelly also pitched collegiately for Western Reserve (now Case Western Reserve University) from 1948 to 1949. As of 2022, Kelly is the last surviving Major Leaguer to have been managed by Rogers Hornsby and Frankie Frisch.

References

External links

1927 births
Living people
Major League Baseball pitchers
Case Western Spartans baseball players
Purdue Boilermakers baseball players
Chicago Cubs players
Cincinnati Redlegs players
Cleveland Indians players
Baseball players from Cleveland
Des Moines Bruins players
Los Angeles Angels (minor league) players
Columbus Jets players
Nashville Vols players
Seattle Rainiers players
Indianapolis Indians players
Rochester Red Wings players
Springfield Cubs players